Qaraməmmədli or Karamamedly or Karamamedli may refer to:
Qaraməmmədli, Agsu, Azerbaijan
Qaraməmmədli, Barda, Azerbaijan
Qaraməmmədli, Fizuli, Azerbaijan
Qaraməmmədli, Gadabay, Azerbaijan
Qaraməmmədli, Yevlakh, Azerbaijan